Flight 200 may refer to:

 Angara Airlines Flight 200, a 2019 airline accident in Russia 
 Garuda Indonesia Flight 200, a 2007 airline accident in Indonesia

See also
 No. 200 Flight RAAF, a Royal Australian Air Force special duties flight of World War II

0200